Huysmans or Huijsmans is a Dutch occupational surname. A "huisman" or "huijsman" is an archaic term for a farmer. It may refer to:

 Camille Huysmans (1871–1968), Belgian politician
 Constant Huysmans (b. 1928), Belgian footballer
 Constant Cornelis Huijsmans (1810–1886), Dutch painter
 Cornelis Huysmans (1648–1727), Flemish painter, brother of Jan Baptist Huysmans
 Gerardus Huysmans (1902–1948), Dutch Minister for Finance (1945) and Economy (1946–1948)
 Jacob Huysmans (c.1633–1696), Flemish portrait painter
 Jan Baptist Huysmans (1654–1716), a Flemish painter, brother of Cornelis Huysmans
 Jan-Baptist Huysmans (1826–1906), Belgian Orientalist painter and travel writer
 Joris-Karl Huysmans (1848–1907), French novelist
 Jos Huysmans (1941–2012), Belgian cyclist

Huijsman/Huysman:
 Harald Huysman (b. 1959), Norwegian race car driver
 Nicolas Huysman (b. 1968), French footballer

See also
 Huisman

Dutch-language surnames
Occupational surnames